Centropyxis is a genus of lobose testate amoebae (Amoebozoa), including the species Centropyxis aculeata.

References

External links
Descriptions and pictures of Centropyxis at Microworld

Amoebozoa genera
Taxa named by Johann Philip Emil Friedrich Stein